Jake's Progress is a 1995 soundtrack album by Elvis Costello and Richard Harvey for Alan Bleasdale's TV series of the same name.

Track listing
All songs written by Elvis Costello and Richard Harvey.
 "Jake's Progress Opening Sequence" – 4:12
 "Map of Africa" – 2:02
 "Julie's Pregnant Pause" – 2:36
 "Monica's Fortune Telling" – 3:28
 "Cisco Kid" – 2:48
 "Graveyard Waltz" – 1:53
 "Housewarning" – 2:16
 "Moving In" – 2:25
 "Howling at the Moon" – 2:21
 "Unhappy Home Service" – 2:22
 "Ursine Variations" – 3:43
 "Mrs. Rampton Reminisces" – 2:07
 "Friend in Need" – 2:16
 "Death of Alex/Closing Titles" – 3:58
 "Remembering Alex" – 2:11
 "Leaving Home" – 2:00
 "Eliot's Heartbreak and Flashback" – 2:56
 "Kate's Abuse" – 2:18
 "Grave Dance" – 2:35
 "Banquo" – 4:15
 "Fall from Grace" – 5:16
 "Play With Me, Mummy" – 4:50

Elvis Costello albums
1995 albums